The Snipe Western Hemisphere and Asia Championship is an international sailing regatta in the Snipe class. The fleet of winning skipper is awarded the Hayward Western Hemisphere Trophy, donated by Commodore John T. Hayward, of Tulsa, Oklahoma. 3 races shall constitute a regatta. It was named Snipe Western Hemisphere & Orient Championship until 2023.

It is sailed every two years (even years), on alternate years with the World Championship, since 1950. The Western Hemisphere & Orient Championship and the European Championship are the main competitions after the Worlds.

Five qualified teams from each county in the Western Hemisphere and Japan, the current champion, the current world champion (providing it represents a WH&O nation), the prior year North American and Orient champions (providing each represents a Western Hemisphere and Orient nation) and the current year South American champion are entitled to compete.

Winners

References

External links 
Results
Website

Snipe competitions
Sailing regattas